William Bayles (1 November 1820 – 8 October 1903), was a mayor of colonial Melbourne, Australia.

Bayles was the second son of William Bayles of Hunderthwaite, Yorkshire, was born in 1820, and emigrated to Tasmania in 1846. Removing to Melbourne in 1852, he went into business as a merchant and shipowner, and was Mayor of Melbourne in 1865, in which year he retired from active business. In 1864 he was elected to the Victorian Legislative Assembly for Villiers and Heytesbury, and was Commissioner of Trade and Customs in the short-lived Sladen ministry from May to July 1868. He had for some years past taken no part in public life. He married, in 1854, Isabel, third daughter of Arthur Buist, of Macquarie River, Tasmania. He died on 8 October 1903 in Melbourne.

References

1820 births
1903 deaths
Members of the Victorian Legislative Assembly
Mayors and Lord Mayors of Melbourne
19th-century Australian politicians